Claude Marcil (born 29 May 1963) is a Canadian fencer. He competed in the individual and team sabre events at the 1984 Summer Olympics.

References

External links
 

1963 births
Canadian male fencers
Fencers at the 1984 Summer Olympics
Living people
Olympic fencers of Canada
People from Chibougamau
Sportspeople from Quebec
Pan American Games medalists in fencing
20th-century Canadian people
Pan American Games bronze medalists for Canada
Medalists at the 1983 Pan American Games
Fencers at the 1983 Pan American Games